Logan is a station on the Port Authority of Allegheny County's light rail network, located in Bethel Park, Pennsylvania. The street level stop is designed as a small commuter stop, serving area residents who walk to the train so they can be taken toward Downtown Pittsburgh.

References

External links 

Port Authority T Stations Listings
Station from Logan Road from Google Maps Street View

Port Authority of Allegheny County stations
Railway stations in the United States opened in 1987
Silver Line (Pittsburgh)